Adam Poniński may refer to:

Adam Poniński (1732-1798), Marshal of the Sejm, Deputy Crown Treasurer
Adam Poniński (1758-1816), prince, general, deputy